Braunau am Inn (German for "Braunau on the Inn") is a town in Upper Austria on the border with Germany. It is known for being the birthplace of Adolf Hitler.

Geography

Braunau is connected by bridges over the Inn with its Bavarian counterpart Simbach am Inn. A traditional port of entry, all border controls have been abolished since the implementation of the Schengen Agreement by Austria in 1997.

The town gave its name to the administrative district. The population of Braunau am Inn was 16,182 in 2011. The municipal area comprises the cadastral communities of Braunau am Inn, Osternberg, and Ranshofen.

History

While the abbey of Ranshofen was already mentioned in the course of the deposition of Tassilo III, Duke of Bavaria, in 788, Braunau itself first appeared as Prounaw in an 1120 deed. The Innviertel region then was part of the Duchy of Bavaria.

Braunau received town rights in 1260, one of the first in present-day Austria. It became a fortress town and important trading route junction, dealing with the salt trade and with ship traffic on the Inn. As a major Bavarian settlement, the town played an outstanding role in the Bavarian uprising against the Austrian occupation during the War of the Spanish Succession, when it hosted the Braunau Parliament, a provisional Bavarian Parliament in 1705 headed by Georg Sebastian Plinganser (born 16 April 1680 in Pfarrkirchen; died 7 May 1738 in Augsburg).

The Late Gothic Braunau parish church dedicated to Saint Stephen was built from 1439 to 1466, replacing an older chapel. The remains of the fortress today house a museum and parts of the former town walls can still be seen. Another museum is housed in refurbished 18th-century public baths.

Within 40 years, Braunau changed hands three times: In 1779, it became an Austrian town under the terms of the  Treaty of Teschen, which settled the War of the Bavarian Succession. During War of the Third Coalition, the Nuremberg bookseller Johann Philipp Palm was arrested at the Braunau fortress by French troops and executed for high treason by personal order of Napoleon in 1806. Under the terms of the 1809 Treaty of Schönbrunn, Braunau became Bavarian again in 1809. In 1816, during reorganisation of Europe after the Napoleonic Wars at the Congress of Vienna, the Kingdom of Bavaria ceded the town to the Austrian Empire and was compensated by the gain of Aschaffenburg. Braunau has been Austrian ever since.

Braunau remained a garrison town of the Austro-Hungarian Army and became the site of a large prisoner of war camp in World War I. After the Nazi  to Nazi Germany in 1938, Ranshofen, which at that time had one of Austria's largest aluminium plants, was incorporated into Braunau. Since 1992, the annual Braunau Contemporary History Days initiated by Andreas Maislinger concentrate on accounting for the past; the town's administration awards the Egon Ranshofen-Wertheimer Award, named after native diplomat Egon Ranshofen-Wertheimer, to honour committed Austrians abroad. Several  were installed in Braunau by the artist Gunter Demnig.

Adolf Hitler's birthplace

Adolf Hitler was born on 20 April 1889 in Braunau am Inn where his father Alois Hitler served as a customs official. He and his family left Braunau and moved to Passau in 1892. Hitler was born in an apartment building recorded at Salzburger Vorstadt 15 in an 1890 register, which housed a craft brewery and several rental flats, one of them occupied by Alois Hitler, his third wife Klara, their son Adolf, and his elder half-siblings Alois Jr. and Angela.

In April 1934, the Passau  published a commemorative article, marking the room where Hitler was born.

After Hitler's personal secretary Martin Bormann purchased the house where Hitler was born for the Nazi Party, it became a cult centre containing an art gallery and a public library. Occupied by US troops at the end of World War II, the building temporarily housed a documentary exhibition on Nazi concentration camps. In 1952, it was restored to its original owners and thereafter used as a city library, a technical college and a day-care centre for disabled people. Since 2011, the house remains vacant. In 2014, the Austrian Ministry decided to open in the house a "House of Responsibility"—a museum dedicated to Hitler's crimes during the existence of the Third Reich.

In the course of the process of coming to terms with the history of Austria in the time of National Socialism, the Braunau mayor Gerhard Skiba in April 1989 — two weeks before Hitler's centenary — took the initiative and placed a memorial stone in front of the building. The stone, commemorating the victims of World War II, is made of granite from the quarry at the Mauthausen concentration camp. It states,  ("For peace, freedom and democracy; never again fascism: millions of dead remind us"). The memorial also serves as a disincentive to "Hitler tourism". In 1972 the Austrian government took over the main lease on the building to further discourage any notion of making it a pilgrimage site, and continues to pay its current owner approximately 4,800 euros in monthly rental. Austria's government has since announced that the house would be torn down and replaced with a new building that has no association with Adolf Hitler. The demolition was recommended by a government-appointed commission and the plan still required formalization via legislation and a parliamentary vote. On 18 October 2016, Austrian interior minister Wolfgang Sobotka said the building would instead be changed to the extent that it "will not be recognizable."

In October 2016, the Austrian government approved a plan to move or demolish the building at Salzburger Vorstadt 15. In July of the same year, the Austrian Parliament passed a law to expropriate the house with its last private owner, Gerlinde Pommer, being compensated for the property. Following the emptying of the building in 2011, Pommer had received €4,700 ($5,200) per month in rent from the Austrian government as it had taken over the main lease. Interior Minister Wolfgang Sobotka lobbied for replacing the original building with an entirely new structure. In June 2020 it was announced that the building would be remodeled and serve as a police station.

In 2011, the Braunau town council voted to revoke any honorary citizenship that may have been conferred on Hitler in 1933. The action was described as "precautionary" as no archival evidence could be found to confirm that he had received it in the first place.

Population

Economy
Braunau has a full range of industries including electronics, metal (AMAG), woodworking, and glass. The town also has the largest aluminium works in Austria.

Education
The BHAK Braunau is the oldest educational establishment in the Innviertel.

The HTL Braunau has been awarded "Most Innovative School in Upper Austria" 7 times, in the years 2012-2014 and 2017-2020.

Sport
After two successful seasons, the local football team, SV Braunau, reached the Austrian 1st Division before suddenly going bankrupt in 2000. The team was re-founded as FC Braunau.

Notable residents
 Franz Xaver Gruber (b.1787–d.1863), teacher and musician, composer of the Christmas carol , known in English as "Silent Night"
 Markus Hammerer (born 1989), football player

 Albert Hainz (born 1964), cyclist, born in Ranshofen
 Adolf Hitler (b.1889–d.1945), Führer of Nazi Germany from 1934 to 1945
 Angela Hitler (b.1883–d.1949), half-sister of Adolf Hitler, second wife of Martin Hammitzsch
 Edmund Glaise von Horstenau (b.1882–d.1946), a military historian, Vice Chancellor  in the Cabinet of Arthur Seyss-Inquart
 Franz Jetzinger (b.1882–d.1965), Jesuit priest, professor of theology in Linz, editor, Social Democratic politician (1919–1934 Member of Parliament; 1932–1934 member of the regional government), author of Hitler Youth (1958)
 Dominik Landertinger (born 1988), biathlete
 Gero Miesenböck (born 1965) neurophysiologist
 Josef Reiter (b.1862–d.1939), composer
 Egon Ranshofen-Wertheimer (b.1894–d.1957), diplomat, journalist, law and political scientists, Emigrant and adviser to the US government during World War II
 Susanne Riess-Passer (born 1961), politician (FPÖ), 2000–2003 Vice Chancellor (Austria) 
 Willi Schneider (b.1903–d.1971) and Rudi Schneider (1908–1957), the brothers were famous in the parapsychology scene during the interwar period
 Wilfried Scharf (born 1955), zither player
 Gerhard Skiba (b.1947–d.2019), mayor of Braunau
 Hans Staininger (b.1508–d.1567), burgomaster (mayor) of Braunau, the man with a very long beard, which caused his death.

Climate

Braunau am Inn has an oceanic climate (Köppen climate classification: Cfb) or, following the 0 °C isotherm, a humid continental climate (Dfb) with warm summers and quite cold winters.

References

External links

 
 Books by Anna Rosmus contain multiple photos of Braunau in 1945: Valhalla Finale, 350 pp, Dorfmeister, Tittling, 2009, (hardcover) . and Ragnarök, 464 pp, Dorfmeister, Tittling, 2010, (hardcover) 

 
Cities and towns in Braunau am Inn District
Populated places on the Inn (river)